Caperonotus is a genus of beetles in the family Cerambycidae, containing the following species:

 Caperonotus cardinalis (Bates, 1870)
 Caperonotus guianensis Dalens & Touroult, 2009
 Caperonotus superbum (Aurivillius, 1897)
 Caperonotus tucurui Napp & Monne, 2008

References

Compsocerini